The 1893 Cincinnati Reds season was a season in American baseball. The team finished tied for sixth place in the National League with a record of 65–63, 20.5 games behind the Boston Beaneaters.

Regular season 
Cincinnati was looking to build on a solid 1892 season in which the team had improved from a record of 56–81 in 1891 to 82–68. First baseman Charles Comiskey returned as player-manager, while the Reds would have a new outfielder, as Jim Canavan joined Cincinnati after spending the previous season with the Chicago Colts. Canavan had struggled offensively with Chicago, hitting only .166 with no homers and 32 RBI in 118 games in 1892.

Catcher Farmer Vaughn had a career season, as he hit .280 with one home run and a team high 108 RBI. Bug Holliday led the Reds with a .310 batting average and 89 RBI, as well as a team high 108 runs scored, while his five home runs tied with Canavan for the team lead. Bid McPhee had a solid season, batting .281 with three home runs and 68 RBI.  Arlie Latham hit .282 with two home runs, 49 RBI and a team best 57 stolen bases.

Frank Dwyer was the ace of the pitching staff, as he led the club with an 18–15 record in a team high 37 games, which included 30 starts, with 28 complete games. Ice Box Chamberlain was 16–12 with a team low 3.73 ERA.

Season summary 
The Reds got off to a solid start, sitting in first place with a 6–3 record after nine games. However, the team would win only ten of their next twenty-nine ball games to fall into tenth place in the National League with a 16–22 record. Cincinnati would be under the .500 mark for a majority of the season, however, the Reds would win ten of their final eleven games to avoid finishing with a losing record, as they ended the season with a 65–63 record, tying the Brooklyn Grooms, 20.5 games behind the pennant-winning Boston Beaneaters.

Season standings

Record vs. opponents

Roster

Player stats

Batting

Starters by position 
Note: Pos = Position; G = Games played; AB = At bats; H = Hits; Avg. = Batting average; HR = Home runs; RBI = Runs batted in

Other batters 
Note: G = Games played; AB = At bats; H = Hits; Avg. = Batting average; HR = Home runs; RBI = Runs batted in

Pitching

Starting pitchers 
Note: G = Games pitched; IP = Innings pitched; W = Wins; L = Losses; ERA = Earned run average; SO = Strikeouts

Other pitchers 
Note: G = Games pitched; IP = Innings pitched; W = Wins; L = Losses; ERA = Earned run average; SO = Strikeouts

References

External links
1893 Cincinnati Reds season at Baseball Reference

Cincinnati Reds seasons
Cincinnati Reds season
Cincinnati Reds